Joan Evans (born Joan Katherine Eunson) is a retired American film actress.

Early years
Evans's parents were Hollywood writers Dale Eunson and Katherine Albert. Her father wrote the book The Day They Gave Babies Away, which was made into the movie All Mine to Give (1957). She was named after actress Joan Crawford, her godmother. She played Gretel in a school performance of Hansel and Gretel.

Acting

Sam Goldwyn
Evans appeared in three movies with actor Farley Granger. Her first film with him was as the title role in Roseanna McCoy (1949), based on the real-life romance between two members of the Hatfield-McCoy feud. She gained the role after producer Samuel Goldwyn conducted a national talent search after the original star, Cathy O'Donnell, pulled out. Evans was only 14 years old when she started work on Roseanna McCoy, and her parents added two years to her age so she could claim to be 16 when the film was released.

Evans' film career was launched with her three pictures opposite Granger, including a supporting role in the drama Our Very Own (1950) and a featured part in the crime story Edge of Doom (1950).

She had top billing as a suicidal teenager in RKO's drama On the Loose (1951), then second billing to Esther Williams in an MGM musical comedy, Skirts Ahoy! (1952).

Goldwyn lent her to Universal, where she was third-billed as Irene Dunne's daughter in It Grows on Trees (1952). She was Audie Murphy's leading lady in Column South (1953).

Television
At Republic, she starred as the love interest of John Derek in a Western, The Outcast (1954), and started appearing on TV shows, including General Electric Theatre, Climax!, The Millionaire, Schlitz Playhouse, Cavalcade of America, Lux Video Theatre, Cheyenne, Wagon Train, 77 Sunset Strip, and Zorro.

She had the lead in a crime film for Republic, A Strange Adventure (1956) and was reunited with Murphy for No Name on the Bullet (1959). For Sam Katzman, she was one of The Flying Fontaines (1959).

Her final performances were in The Chevy Mystery Show, The Rebel, Outlaws, Tales of Wells Fargo, The Brothers Brannagan, Ripcord, and The Tall Man. Her last feature film was The Walking Target.  Her last role was in the episode "The Killer Legend" of Laramie as Julie Wade.

She retired from acting in 1961.

Journalism
In the 1950s, Evans wrote articles for Photoplay magazine. Beginning in May 1966, she was editor of Hollywood Studio Magazine, using her married name, Joan Evans Weatherly.

Later years
Evans became an educator, and in the 1970s, she was the director of Carden Academy in Van Nuys, California.

Personal life
On July 24, 1952, when Evans was 18 years old, she married car dealer Kirby Weatherly in Joan Crawford's home. Her parents asked Crawford, their daughter's godmother, to dissuade her from marrying, since she was so young, but Crawford (reportedly bearing a grudge against Evans' parents over a perceived offense) not only gave the couple her blessing, but she made the arrangements and had the wedding ceremony performed right in her own house without notifying Evans' parents. Evans's marriage to Weatherly lasted, but the friendship between Evans' parents and Crawford ended permanently.

The Weatherlys had a daughter on August 16, 1955. In 1984, Joan Evans and her husband signed a tribute to Joan Crawford in Daily Variety.

Filmography

Film
Roseanna McCoy (1949) – Roseanna McCoy
Our Very Own (1950) – Joan Macaulay
Edge of Doom (1950) – Rita Conroy
On the Loose (1951) – Jill Bradley
Skirts Ahoy! (1952) – Mary Kate Yarbrough
It Grows on Trees (1952) – Diane Baxter
Column South (1953) – Marcy Whitlock
The Outcast (1954) – Judy Polsen
A Strange Adventure (1956) – Terry Dolgin
No Name on the Bullet (1959) – Anne Benson
The Flying Fontaines (1959) – Jan Fontaine
The Walking Target (1960) – Gail Russo

Television
General Electric Theater (1954)
Climax! (1954–1955) – Helen O'Neill, Narrator
The Millionaire (1956) – Julie
Schlitz Playhouse of Stars (1956)
Cavalcade of America (1957)
Lux Video Theatre (1956–1957)
Cheyenne (1958) – Lilac (Episode – "The Angry Sky")
77 Sunset Strip (1958) – Diane Forsythe
Wagon Train (1959) – Sarah
Zorro (1959) – Leonar
The Chevy Mystery Show (1960) – Blanche
The Rebel (1960) – Cassie
Outlaws (1961) – Molly Moore
Tales of Wells Fargo (1961) – Kathy Davidson
The Brothers Brannagan (1960–1961) – Terry, Peggy Dodd
Ripcord (1961) – Juli Warner
The Tall Man (1961) – Lou Belle Martin
Laramie 1961 – Julie Wade

References

External links
 

Living people
20th-century American actresses
Actresses from California
Actresses from New York City
American film actresses
American television actresses
American educators
American magazine editors
Women magazine editors
21st-century American women
Year of birth missing (living people)